The 2022 KBS Entertainment Awards ( presented by Korean Broadcasting System (KBS), took place on December 24, 2022, at KBS New Wing Open Hall in Yeouido-dong, Yeongdeungpo-gu, Seoul. The 20th anniversary ceremony was opened with a special performance that looks back on the past KBS entertainment and covers it all. The awards ceremony was broadcast live at KBS Hall at 21.15 (KST). It was hosted by Seol In-ah, Moon Se-yoon and Kang Chan-hee.

This year Immortal Songs: Singing the Legend won the 'Best Program Award', directly selected by viewers. In addition, there was a stage dedicated to the late Song Hae, who has firmly maintained his place as a national song boasting MC. Another highlight of this year's ceremony was stars, who are active in various fields attended as presenters. 7 people united as Kondaz, viz. Heo Jae, Kim Byung-hyun, Kim Jung-tae, Lee Dae-Hyung, Jung Ho-young, Yoo Hee-gwan, and Kwak Beom, performed "Never Ending Story" as 'Special stage'. 

Shin Dong-yup won the Grand Prize and Entertainer of the Year award along with Kim Sook, Jun Hyun-moo, Kim Jong-min, and Lee Kyung-kyu.

Nominations and winners

Presenters

Performances

See also 
 2022 MBC Entertainment Awards
 2022 SBS Entertainment Awards

References

External links 
  

 

Korean Broadcasting System original programming
KBS Entertainment Awards
2022 television awards
2022 in South Korea